Transcription elongation factor SPT6 is a protein that in humans is encoded by the SUPT6H gene.

References

Further reading